The 57th World Science Fiction Convention (Worldcon), also known as Aussiecon Three, was held on 2–6 September 1999 at the Melbourne Convention and Exhibition Centre in Melbourne, Australia.

The convention was chaired by Perry Middlemiss.

Participants

Guests of Honour 

 Gregory Benford, author
 George Turner, author
 Bruce Gillespie, fan

Special guest 

 J. Michael Straczynski, media

Noteworthy program participants

Awards

1999 Hugo Awards 

The Hugo Award ceremony was directed and hosted by Michael Jordan and Executive assistant Paula McGrath.

 Best Novel: To Say Nothing of the Dog by Connie Willis
 Best Novella: "Oceanic" by Greg Egan (Asimov's, August 1998)
 Best Novelette: "Taklamakan" by Bruce Sterling (Asimov's, October/November 1998)
 Best Short Story: "The Very Pulse of the Machine" by Michael Swanwick (Asimov's February 1998)
 Best Related Book: The Dreams Our Stuff is Made Of by Thomas M. Disch
 Best Dramatic Presentation: The Truman Show
 Best Professional Editor: Gardner Dozois
 Best Professional Artist: Bob Eggleton
 Best Semiprozine: Locus, edited by Charles N. Brown
 Best Fanzine: Ansible, edited by Dave Langford
 Best Fan Writer: Dave Langford
 Best Fan Artist: Ian Gunn

Other awards 

 John W. Campbell Award for Best New Writer: Nalo Hopkinson

Future site selection 

San Jose, California won the vote for the 62nd World Science Fiction Convention in 2005 by a large majority. A hoax bid for Roswell, New Mexico was the only other bid filed.

Committee

Chair 

 Perry Middlemiss

Division heads 

 Finance: Rose Mitchell
 Administration: Julian Warner
 Publicity: Alan Stewart
 Major Events: Perry Middlemiss
 Publications: Mark Loney
 Program Operations: Janice Gelb
 Programming: Donna Heenan
 Fixed Functions: Nick Price, Jason Sharples
 Facilities: Stephen Boucher
 WSFS: Stephen Boucher
 InterDivisional Liaison: Michael AJ Jordan

Directors 

 Stephen Boucher
 Christine Dziadosz
 Donna Heenan
 Michael Jordan
 Mark Linneman
 Perry Middlemiss
 Alan Stewart

Bid 

 Bid chair: Alan Stewart

See also 

 Aussiecon One (1975)
 Aussiecon Two (1985)
 Hugo Award
 Science fiction
 Speculative fiction
 World Science Fiction Society
 Worldcon

References

External links 

 Official website (as archived 20 September 2010)

1990s in Melbourne
1999 conferences
1999 in Australia
20th-century Australian literature
Science and technology in Melbourne
Science fiction conventions in Australia
Worldcon